"Qpid" is the 94th episode of the syndicated American science fiction television series Star Trek: The Next Generation, the 20th episode of the fourth season.

Set in the 24th century, the series follows the adventures of the Starfleet crew of the Federation starship Enterprise-D. In this episode, Captain Picard and Vash are reunited when the Enterprise hosts an archaeology symposium, but their disparate personalities soon have them sparring. Q arrives and offers to do Captain Picard a favor by getting him and Vash back together again. When Picard rejects the notion, Q transforms the captain into Robin Hood and sends him, Vash, and several members of Picard's senior staff to Sherwood Forest.

Plot
Captain Picard is working late on a speech that he will present to visiting archaeologists when Counselor Troi tells him that the council members have arrived and been assigned quarters. Picard returns to his quarters and finds Vash waiting for him, and the two kiss. The next morning, the two are sharing breakfast when Doctor Crusher arrives and offers to give Vash a tour. Vash expresses surprise and slight anger at the fact the Captain hasn't told his friends about her and confronts him about this at a reception for the delegates. After the reception, Q returns to repay Captain Picard for saving him in "Deja Q". Picard requests nothing, so Q decides to save Picard by testing Picard's love for Vash.

While Picard is addressing the delegates, Q transports the bridge crew to medieval England, where Captain Picard is Robin Hood and the bridge crew are the Merry Men. English soldiers attack the group and the group retreats to the forest.

Q assumes the role of the Sheriff of Nottingham and has imprisoned Vash, now Maid Marian. Picard must rescue Vash as she is sentenced to die for treason. Vash manipulates Sir Guy of Gisbourne into sparing her life by professing love and promising marriage. Picard realizes that if he does nothing, Vash will die. He orders his officers to remain in the woods, then disguises himself and infiltrates the castle as a peasant worker.

Picard climbs up to the tower and through the window. The two bicker over the merits of Picard's rescue plan, and Vash refuses to go. Picard begins to carry her away when a group enters. Picard is taken away by the guards, and Vash tries to send a message to Commander Riker, which is stopped by Q, who reveals himself to Vash and has her taken away.

At the chopping block, Picard's officers reveal themselves disguised as monks and create a diversion. Picard and his staff prove themselves formidable fighters and win. Picard frees Vash, who leaves with Q to explore the galaxy. Q guarantees Vash's safety; with that, Picard considers Q's debt paid in full.

Reception
In Star Trek Entertainment Weekly Collectors Edition Fall 1994, celebrating the entire Star Trek franchise shortly after the Next Generation finale aired, Entertainment Weekly ranked the episode as the eighth worst of the series.

Zack Handlen of The A.V. Club gave the episode a grade B−. Keith DeCandido of Tor.com rated it 5 out of 10.

In 2016, Empire ranked this the 50th best out of the top 50 episodes of all the 700 plus Star Trek television episodes.

"Qpid" was noted as the fifth funniest episode of the Star Trek franchise, as ranked by CBR in 2019. They note a multitude of funny moments, calling it a "delightful romp" and praising Patrick Stewart's performance as a Federation Captain turned Robin Hood, as well as the various guest characters such as Vash. Some of the scenes singled out are Worf's declaration and Troi's archery skills.
CBR rated the relationship between Picard and Vash characters as the 12th best romance of Star Trek.
In 2018, Tom's Guide rated "Qpid" one of the 15 best episodes featuring Picard.

In 2018, Entertainment Weekly, ranked "Qpid" as one of the top ten moments of Jean-Luc Picard.
Den of Geek noted this episode for featuring romantic elements, in 2019.

In 2019, Screen Rant ranked "Qpid" the 8th funniest episode of Star Trek: The Next Generation.

Home video 
This episode was released in the United States on September 3, 2002, as part of the Star Trek: The Next Generation season four DVD box set.

CBS announced on September 28, 2011, in celebration of the series' twenty-fifth anniversary, that Star Trek: The Next Generation would be completely re-mastered in 1080p high definition from the original 35mm film negatives. For the remaster almost 25,000 reels of original film stock were rescanned and reedited, and all visual effects were digitally recomposed from original large-format negatives and newly created CGI shots. The release was accompanied by 7.1 DTS Master Audio. On July 30, 2013 "Qpid" was released on 1080p high definition as part of the Season 4 Blu-ray box set in the United States. The set was released on July 29, 2013, in the United Kingdom.

See also

 Captain's Holiday in Star Trek: The Next Generation that began the Vash storyline.
 Q-Less episode in Star Trek: Deep Space 9 that ended the Vash storyline.

References

 Star Trek The Next Generation DVD set, volume 4, disc 5, selection 4

External links

 

 And guest-starring .... Robin Hood Large comparative study of "Qpid" and three other Robin Hood-related TV episodes

Star Trek: The Next Generation (season 4) episodes
1991 American television episodes
Robin Hood television episodes
Television episodes directed by Cliff Bole